Rock Creek USD 323 is a public unified school district headquartered in St. George, Kansas, United States.  The district includes the communities of St George, Westmoreland, Blaine, Flush, and nearby rural areas.

Schools
The school district operates the following schools:
 Rock Creek Junior/Senior High School in St George
 St. George Elementary School in St. George
 Westmoreland Elementary School in Westmoreland

Athletics
Football:
2000 - 3A Mid-East League, District, Bi-District, Regional, Sectional Champs
2002 - 3A District, Bi-District Champs
2003 - 3A District, Bi-District Champs 
2004 - 3A Mid-East League, Bi-District Champs
2005 - 3A District, Bi-District Champs
2006 - 3A District, Bi-District Champs
2008 - 4A District, Bi-District, and Regional Champs
2011 - 3A Bi-District, Regional, and Sectional Champs, Substate Runner-up

See also
 Kansas State Department of Education
 Kansas State High School Activities Association
 List of high schools in Kansas
 List of unified school districts in Kansas

References

External links
 

Education in Pottawatomie County, Kansas
School districts in Kansas